The 1922 Arizona Wildcats football team represented the University of Arizona as an independent during the 1922 college football season. In their eighth season under head coach Pop McKale, the Wildcats compiled a 6–3 record and outscored their opponents, 109 to 53. The team captain was John Cole Hobbs.

Schedule

References

Arizona
Arizona Wildcats football seasons
Arizona Wildcats football